Epacris corymbiflora is a species of flowering plant in the heath family, Ericaceae, and is endemic to Tasmaina. It is a low, spreading shrub with elliptic leaves and white, tube-shaped flowers.

Description 
Both sides of the leaves are green and there are a few more or less parallel veins.

Taxonomy and naming 
Epacris corymbiflora was first formally described in 1857 by Joseph Dalton Hooker in The botany of the Antarctic voyage of H.M. Discovery ships Erebus and Terror. III. Flora Tasmaniae from specimens collected near the Franklin River in Macquarie Harbour by Ronald Campbell Gunn.

Distribution and habitat 
This epacris is common in moorland environments and button grass heath in near-coastal areas of Tasmania.

Use in horticulture
Epacris corymbiflora grows well in containers or pots due to its excellent capacity as a dwarf species. The seed of some strains exhibits a dormancy stage that is reportedly overcome by storage in a dark place for 3–6 months. If using the bog method, seed should be spread over the surface of the propagation mixture. If such medium is kept constantly moist, germination should occur within 10–20 weeks.

References 

corymbifolia
Endemic flora of Tasmania
Taxa named by Joseph Dalton Hooker
Plants described in 1857